Northern Irish people is a demonym for all people born in Northern Ireland or people who are entitled to reside in Northern Ireland without any restriction on their period of residence. Most Northern Irish people either identify as Northern Irish, Irish or British, or a combination thereof.

National identity

In Northern Ireland, national identity is complex and diverse. The question of national identity was asked in the 2021 census with the three most common identities given being British, Irish and Northern Irish. Most people of Protestant background consider themselves British, while a majority of people of Catholic background are Irish. This has origins in the 17th-century Plantation of Ulster. 

In the early 20th century, most Ulster Protestants and Catholics saw themselves as Irish, although Protestants tended to have a strong sense of Britishness also. Following the Home Rule Crisis and Irish War of Independence, Protestants gradually began to abandon Irish identity, as Irishness and Britishness came to be seen moreso as mutually exclusive. In 1968 – just before the onset of the Troubles – 39% of Protestants described themselves as British and 20% of Protestants described themselves as Irish, while 32% chose an Ulster identity. By 1978, following the worst years of the conflict, there had been a large shift in identity amongst Protestants, with the majority (67%) now calling themselves British and only 8% calling themselves Irish. This shift has not been reversed. Meanwhile, the majority of Catholics have continued to see themselves as Irish.

From 1989, 'Northern Irish' began to be included as an identity choice in surveys, and its popularity has grown since then. Some organizations have promoted 'Northern Irish' identity as a way of overcoming sectarian division. In a 1998 survey of students, this was one of the main reasons they gave for choosing that identity, along with a desire to appear 'neutral'. However, surveys show that 'Northern Irish' identity tends to have different meanings for Catholics and Protestants. Surveys also show that those choosing 'Northern Irish' alone regard their national identity as less important than those choosing British and Irish.

In recent Northern Ireland censuses, respondents could choose more than one national identity. In 2021:
42.8% identified as British, alone or with other national identities
33.3% identified as Irish, alone or with other national identities
31.5% identified as Northern Irish, alone or with other national identities

The main national identities given in recent censuses were:

The numbers for each identity were as follows:

National Identity by Religion (2011)

Those people in Northern Ireland who fall into the category of other religions amounts to less than one percent of the population.

Detail by Religion (2011)

Note that Northern Ireland is made up of approximately 42% Protestant; 41% Roman Catholic; 17% no religion; and 0.8% other religions.

National Identity by District (2011)

National identity by religion or religion brought up in for each district (2011)

National Identity by Age (2011)

Surveys

In 1998 the Northern Ireland Life and Times Survey started asking respondents whether they think of themselves as British, Irish, Ulster, or Northern Irish. According to the 2019 survey of this series, individuals from Northern Ireland identify as:

 British (39%)
 Irish (25%)
 Northern Irish (27%)
 Ulster (1%)
 Other (8%)

In the 2007 Northern Ireland Life and Times Survey, the question was asked, "thinking about each of these national identities in turn, how strongly do you feel yourself to be [Irish/British/Northern Irish/Ulster?]" Individuals responded for each of the identities as follows:

Northern Irish

 Very strongly          50%
 Not very strongly        34%
 Not at all               15%
 Don't know               0%

British

 Very strongly            37%
 Not very strongly        41%
 Not at all               22%
 Don't know               0%

Irish

 Very strongly            36%
 Not very strongly        41%
 Not at all               23%
 Don't know               0%

Ulster

 Very strongly            31%
 Not very strongly        40%
 Not at all               28%
 Don't know               1%

See also
Demography of Northern Ireland
Ulster Scots people
Ulster Protestants
List of districts in Northern Ireland by national identity

References

 *